The 2006 Southend-on-Sea Council election took place on 4 May 2006 to elect members of Southend-on-Sea Unitary Council in Essex, England. One third of the council was up for election and the Conservative party stayed in overall control of the council.

After the election, the composition of the council was
Conservative 30
Liberal Democrat 9
Labour 8
Alliance Southend 4

Campaign
The election saw a candidate from a new party, Mums' Army, stand in West Shoebury ward. The party was founded by Take a Break magazine with a platform of addressing anti-social behaviour in the community.

Meanwhile, the Labour party was unable to put up candidates in 5 wards after their nomination papers were stolen just before they were to be handed in.

Election result
The results saw the Conservatives stay in control of the council after winning 11 of the 19 seats which were contested. However this was one down on before the election, after the Conservative council leader, Anna Waite, was defeated in Prittlewell by the Liberal Democrats. The Liberal Democrats gained 2 seats to overtake Labour as the second largest party on the council with 9 councillors, as against 8 for Labour. Overall turnout in the election was 34%.

Ward results

References

2006
2006 English local elections
2000s in Essex